The following table shows the world record progression in the women's 50 kilometres walk, as recognised by the IAAF.

Unlike the men's 50K walk, the women's 50K walk is a new event, having been added to the IAAF World Athletics Championships for the first time in 2017.

World record progression

See also 
 Women's 10 kilometres walk world record progression
 Men's 10 kilometres walk world record progression
 Women's 20 kilometres walk world record progression
 Men's 20 kilometres walk world record progression
 Men's 50 kilometres walk world record progression

References

Walk, 50 km women
Records